The Arroyo Seco Fight was a clash between militia and Rangers of the Republic of Texas and a large Comanche war party traveling with Chief Essowakkenny, which took place on the Seco Creek in Medina County, Texas, on August 10, 1838.

Background 
On December 28, 1837, Henry Wax Karnes was authorized to raise eight companies of Texas Rangers to patrol and defend the frontier of Texas. On August 10, 1837, Karnes and his men camped on Seco Creek. Members of the patrol included Jack Hays and Benjamin F. Cage.

Battle 
While encamped on the Seco Creek resting their horses, the unit was suddenly attacked by about 200 Comanches on horseback. Karnes alerted his men to take cover in the ravine, using the thick brush for cover. While outnumbered about 10:1, the Texans held their ground and fired in alternate sequences with around seven men shooting at a time. This method would give some time to reload as others fired. The Comanches fought fiercely, fighting and regrouping, unleashing three separate attacks. Hays singled out the chief and eliminated the threat. Arrows flew in barrages until 20 Comanches lay dead on the ground, with as many wounded. The Comanches then gathered their wounded and returned to their village. 

Although an overwhelming victory for the Texans, Karnes, who had been directing the battle from a bluff, was wounded, and several the Rangers' horses were shot dead.

Notes

References 

 Account of Karnes fight on the Arroyo Seco from Indian Wars and Pioneers of Texas by John Henry Brown published 1880, hosted by The Portal to Texas History
Contemporary newspaper account, Telegraph and Texas Register, Vol. 4, Saturday, September 1, 1838,  hosted by The Portal to Texas History

Conflicts in 1838
Arroyo Seco Fight
Battles involving the Comanche
Battles of the Texas Ranger Division
Comanche tribe
Texas–Indian Wars
Battles involving the Republic of Texas
August 1838 events